Bebearia mandinga, the Mandinga forester, is a butterfly in the family Nymphalidae. It is found in Guinea, Sierra Leone, Liberia, Ivory Coast, Ghana, Togo, Nigeria, Cameroon, Gabon, the Republic of the Congo, the Central African Republic, the Democratic Republic of the Congo and Uganda. The habitat consists of forests.

The larvae feed on Hypselodelphys species, including H. scandens.

Subspecies
Bebearia mandinga mandinga (Guinea, Sierra Leone, Liberia, Ivory Coast, Ghana, Togo, Nigeria, Cameroon, Gabon, Congo, the Central African Republic, the Democratic Republic of the Congo)
Bebearia mandinga beni Hecq, 1990 (eastern Democratic Republic of the Congo, Uganda: Semuliki National Park, Toro)

References

Butterflies described in 1860
mandinga
Butterflies of Africa
Taxa named by Baron Cajetan von Felder
Taxa named by Rudolf Felder